John Farmer (c. 1570c. 1601) was an important composer of the English Madrigal School. He was born in England during the Elizabethan period, and was also known by his skillful settings for four voices of the old church psalm tunes. His exact date of birth is not known – a 1926 article by Grattan Flood posits a date around 1564 to 1565 based on matriculation records. Farmer was under the patronage of the Earl of Oxford and dedicated his collection of canons and his late madrigal volume to his patron.

In 1595, Farmer was appointed organist and Master of Children at Christ Church Cathedral, Dublin and also, at the same time, organist of St Patrick's Cathedral, Dublin. In 1599, he moved to London and published his only collection of four-part madrigals, that he dedicated to Edward de Vere.

His Lord's Prayer is performed widely throughout many Churches and Cathedrals, mostly in Britain. It is included in Volume 2 of Oxford Choral Classics, published by Oxford University Press.

Giles Farnaby dedicated a pavan to him, included in the Fitzwilliam Virginal Book as Farmer's Paven (no. CCLXXXVII).

Selected works
Fair Phyllis I Saw Sitting All Alone
Fair Nymphs, I Heard One Telling
A Little Pretty Bonny Lass
Take Time While Time Doth Last

References

External links

A free recording of a song from Umeå Akademiska Kör

English madrigal composers
English organists
British male organists
Renaissance composers
English Baroque composers
1570s births
1601 deaths
People of the Elizabethan era
English classical composers
16th-century English composers
17th-century English composers
17th-century classical composers
English male classical composers